Ulivellia is a genus of picture-winged flies in the family Ulidiidae.

Species
 U. inversa

References

Ulidiidae